Georgia Time (GET) is a time zone used in Georgia (except Russian-occupied territories of Georgia) and it is uniform throughout the country.  It moved from zone UTC+04:00 to UTC+03:00 on 27 June 2004, then back to UTC+04:00 on 27 March 2005. Georgia does not observe daylight saving time since 2004.

IANA time zone database
The IANA time zone database contains one zone for Georgia in the file zone.tab, which is named Asia/Tbilisi.

References

Georgia
Culture of Georgia (country)
Georgia